Soumik Chatterjee (born 27 September 1988) is an Indian first-class cricketer who plays for Services.

References

External links
 

1988 births
Living people
Indian cricketers
Services cricketers
People from Howrah